The 1999–2000 Temple Owls men's basketball team represented Temple University in the 1999–00 NCAA Division I men's basketball season. They were led by head coach John Chaney in his 18th year. The Owls were undefeated at home, both in Atlantic-10 games and overall. After winning the Atlantic-10 Tournament, the Owls received an automatic bid to the NCAA tournament and were seeded #2 in the East Region. They played at the First Niagara Center and defeated the Lafayette Leopards 73–47 in the first round. However, in the second round the Owls were upset by 10th seeded Seton Hall in a close overtime game (65–67).

Roster

Schedule and results

|-
!colspan=12 style=|Regular season

|-
!colspan=12 style=|Atlantic 10 tournament

|-
!colspan=12 style=|NCAA tournament

Rankings

Awards and honors
Pepe Sanchez – Atlantic 10 Player of the Year

References

Temple
Temple Owls men's basketball seasons
Temple
Temple
Temple